Below are listed all participating squads of the 2002 FIVB Volleyball Men's World Championship, held in Salta, Córdoba, Mar del Plata, Buenos Aires, Santa Fe and San Juan, Argentina from 28 September to 13 October 2002 .

Squads

Argentina

Australia

Brazil

Bulgaria

Canada

PR China

Croatia

Cuba

Czech Republic

Egypt

France

Greece

Italy

Japan

Kazakhstan

Netherlands

Poland

Portugal

Russia

Spain

Tunisia

United States

Venezuela

Yugoslavia

External links
Teams & Pools

FIVB Volleyball Men's World Championship squads
2002 in volleyball